Ilie Năstase defeated Nikola Pilić in the final, 6–3, 6–3, 6–0 to win the men's singles tennis title at the 1973 French Open.

Andrés Gimeno was the defending champion, but lost in the second round to Guillermo Vilas.

This was the first major appearance for future six-time French Open champion Björn Borg.

Seeds
The seeded players are listed below. Ilie Năstase is the champion; others show the round in which they were eliminated. 

  Stan Smith (fourth round)
  Ilie Năstase (champion)
 n/a
  Arthur Ashe (fourth round)
  Manuel Orantes (second round)
  John Newcombe (first round)
  Andrés Gimeno (second round)
  Adriano Panatta (semifinals)
  Cliff Richey (first round)
  Roger Taylor (quarterfinals)
  Patrick Proisy (first round)
  Jimmy Connors (first round)
  Mark Cox (second round)
  Jan Kodeš (quarterfinals)
  François Jauffret (fourth round)
  Tom Okker (quarterfinals)

Qualifying

Draw

Key
 Q = Qualifier
 WC = Wild card
 LL = Lucky loser
 r = Retired

Finals

Section 1

Section 2

Section 3

Section 4

Section 5

Section 6

Section 7

Section 8

External links
 Association of Tennis Professionals (ATP) – 1973 French Open Men's Singles draw
1973 French Open – Men's draws and results at the International Tennis Federation

Men's Singles
French Open by year – Men's singles
1973 Grand Prix (tennis)